Ministry of Information and Communication or Communications may refer to:

Ministry of Information and Communication (Bhutan)
Ministry of Information and Communication (Cuba), Cuba
Ministry of Information and Communication (Fiji), Fiji
Ministry of Information and Communications (Kenya)
Ministry of Information and Communications (Nepal)
Ministry of Information and Communication (South Korea)
Ministry of Information and Communications (Vietnam)

See also
Ministry of Information (disambiguation)